Ataxia arizonica is a species of beetle in the family Cerambycidae. It was described by Warren Samuel Fisher in 1920. It is known from Mexico and the United States.

References

Ataxia (beetle)
Beetles described in 1920